White Lily Lake is a lake in Kanabec County, in the U.S. state of Minnesota.

White Lily Lake was named for the white water lilies found there.

See also
List of lakes in Minnesota

References

Lakes of Minnesota
Lakes of Kanabec County, Minnesota